Melvin Gregg is an American actor, model and comedian known for his roles as DeMarcus Tillman in Netflix's mockumentary series American Vandal, Erick Scott in Steven Soderbergh’s sports drama film High Flying Bird, Drew 'Manboy' Miller on FX's crime drama Snowfall, and Ben Chandler in the Hulu miniseries Nine Perfect Strangers.

Life and career
Gregg was born in Portsmouth, Virginia to parents Constance Gregg and Melvin Vaughan. He has six sisters. After graduating from I.C. Norcom High School, he studied marketing at Old Dominion University for 2 years before changing his career path and moved to Los Angeles in 2011 to pursue acting.

Gregg came to prominence by creating and sharing comedic content in which he starred, wrote, and produced on Vine. He amassed more than 7 million followers in the course of 3 years, becoming one of the top 100 personalities on the platform.

His first credited role was in the web series Whatever, The Series. in 2011 where he earned union eligibility. Following Vine’s decline in 2015, Gregg transitioned into film and TV roles. In 2018 he earned roles in the Netflix mockumentary series American Vandal and in the film High Flying Bird. Gregg's performance as DeMarcus Tillman garnered him praise from outlets such as Film School Rejects and a comparison from Live Mint to actor Will Smith in The Fresh Prince of Bel-Air. Entertainment Weekly and Vulture have described the role as a breakout one for Gregg.

Gregg joined the cast in the third (2019) season of the FX television series Snowfall in the main role of Drew 'Manboy' Miller, and portrayed the character of Marcus Parrish in the sports drama The Way Back in 2020. He also filmed a video examining BET's support of Black culture during the early 2000s alongside Sam Jay. During 2020 Gregg also announced that he would be creating a movie for the newly launched interactive fiction app Whatifi, entitled This Call Will Be Recorded. Viewers would be able to select choices that would enable them to view one of sixteen different endings. In 2021, he played Joe Guy in The United States vs. Billie Holiday, and had a series regular role in the Hulu limited series Nine Perfect Strangers.

Personal life
Gregg and partner Bobbie Leigh Nelson have one son, Marley Amel Gregg, born on May 15, 2020.

Filmography

Film

Television

Awards

References

External links

Melvin Gregg on Instagram
Melvin Gregg on Twitter

People from Portsmouth, Virginia
Male actors from Los Angeles
1988 births
Models from Virginia
Models from Los Angeles
Living people
African-American actors
African-American models
21st-century American actors
American Internet celebrities
Vine (service) celebrities
21st-century African-American people
20th-century African-American people